Heikki Raitio (29 July 1924 – 12 February 1997) was a Finnish épée and foil fencer. He competed at the 1948 and 1952 Summer Olympics.

References

1924 births
1997 deaths
Finnish male épée fencers
Olympic fencers of Finland
Fencers at the 1948 Summer Olympics
Fencers at the 1952 Summer Olympics
Sportspeople from Helsinki
Finnish male foil fencers